The third Battle of Changsha (24 December 1941 – 15 January 1942) was the first major offensive in China by Imperial Japanese forces following the Japanese attack on the Western Allies. The offensive resulted in failure for the Japanese, as Chinese forces were able to lure them into a trap and encircle them. After suffering heavy casualties, Japanese forces were forced to carry out a general retreat.

Planning and forces 
The offensive was originally intended to prevent Chinese forces from reinforcing the British Commonwealth forces engaged in Hong Kong. Infuriated by Chinese claims of having defeated him in his September-October 1941 Changsha Offensive, Japanese Eleventh Army commander General Korechika Anami originally intended to mount a thrust with his army to support the Twenty-Third Army's attack on Hong Kong. Anami's main force consisted of 27 infantry battalions, 10 artillery battalions, and one artillery battery.

Attack 
The Japanese commenced combat operations on 24 December 1941, with the 6th and 40th Divisions leading the way. Japanese forces initially cut through Chinese defenders. By 29 December 1941, believing that the city of Changsha was "inadequately defended", Anami elected to capture it. He committed the 3rd and 6th Divisions and his forces were surprised to be met with fierce opposition. The 3rd Division penetrated the southeastern side of the city but made no further advances. On 4 January 1942, the Eleventh Army occupied "all the important points of the city," but they were in danger of encirclement by counterattacking Chinese.

Result 
With the prospect of becoming encircled, and low on ammunition and rations, the Eleventh Army ordered a withdrawal on 4 January 1942. While both withdrawing and protecting rear service units and wounded personnel, Eleventh Army forces fended off attack by nine Chinese armies and over 20 Chinese divisions. Some Japanese units — like the 200-man detachment from the 9th Independent Mixed Brigade, fromwhich only one man survived — were almost completely destroyed.

See also
Battle of Changsha (1939)
Battle of Changsha (1941)
Battle of Changsha (1944)
Battle of Changsha (TV series), the TV series depicting this event

References

Changsha 1942
Conflicts in 1942
Battle
1941 in China
1942 in China
1942 in Japan
1941 in Japan
Second Sino-Japanese War